Various Special Advisory Committees (SAC) are formed (and disbanded) on an ad-hoc basis in Canadian government circles, especially public health as governed by the Public Health Agency of Canada.

History
The SACs invariably have the acronym FPT or F/P/T attached to them; the acronym stands for Federal/Provincial/Territorial. The committees join civil servants in various ministries at all FPT levels of government. The FPT structure was hatched in April 2004 by Anne McLellan, who then occupied the role of Deputy Prime Minister. Her Securing an Open Society: Canada's National Security Policy document was released to public view in Parliament; and the FPT acronym was birthed. The system of national security was bestowed on that day: "a permanent, high-level federal-provincial-territorial forum on emergencies, which will allow for regular strategic discussion of emergency management issues among key national players."

Examples of such SACs are the:
 SAC on COVID-19
 SAC on the Epidemic of Opioid Overdoses
 SAC on Biological Events
 SAC on H1N1

References

Government of Canada